Celebrated: 
Keat Hwa Centennial Celebrations is a series of events held in celebration of the 100 years of existence of Keat Hwa Secondary School, Keat Hwa II Secondary School, Keat Hwa High School and three other Chinese primary schools.

Keat Hwa Centennial Celebrations also mark the existence of Chinese education in Malaysia for more than 100 years.

A centenary celebration committee was set up prior to the celebration by the Keat Hwa Alumni Organisation (吉华校友会). The committee is fully in charge of the celebrations with the co-operation from the school authorities. A series of events were organised throughout the year, culminating with a 3-day celebration, to mark this auspicious year for Keat Hwa, from 28 to 31 July 2011.

The 3-day gala event was held at the Keat Hwa Secondary School (吉华卓越华文中学) compound. Besides exhibition booths, there were several other unique and meaningful events organised. Among the huge events are the Grand Festival, Grand Dinner and the Grand Expo. Other events include the celebration of Mooncake Festival by all the six Keat Hwa schools, singing competition, torch relay, Chinese cultural activities and, most importantly, the celebration of Chinese education in Malaysia.

The 3-day event successfully attracted more than 35,000 students and alumnus from all over the world. The centenary celebration marked a milestone of Keat Hwa and showcased the success of the Chinese community in fighting for their own Chinese education, mother-tongue language and culture. Besides, the celebration was able to collect donations to set up an Education Fund for the usage of Keat Hwa schools in the coming years.

Grand Festival 
Grand Festival (大庆典) was one of the biggest events of the celebrations. The Opening Ceremony with the participants of more than 1000 students, consisting different clubs and societies, uniformed units, Boards of Directors from 6 schools and also the alumnus of Keat Hwa. Before the opening ceremony, a parade was held where all the teams marched from the oldest school building, Keat Hwa (S) to Keat Hwa Secondary School. The parade was the only major procession held in the city of Alor Setar in the last few decades to celebrate the anniversary of a school. The journey was roughly 5 kilometres and it caught the attention of the citizens of Alor Setar. Some even joined the parade which ended at the Keat Hwa Secondary School. The whole journey was held successfully with the help of the Malaysian police and the paramilitary civil volunteer corps controlling the traffic in the city.

A torch tower was designed and built for the Opening Ceremony with more than a million can tabs weighing more than 1100 kg. The preparation of the torch tower involved the participation of all students, teachers and alumnus of Keat Hwa Secondary School. The achievement was recorded into the Malaysia Book of Records.

Grand Expo 
Grand Expo (大博览) was another huge event in the 3-day celebration. Besides booths, there were performances such as  Chinese Orchestra, Wushu, cheer leadings, street dances, concerts and night markets, which added colour to the spirited celebration.

The Malaysian Prime Minister, Dato' Sri Najib Razak also attended the opening ceremony of the Grand Expo. Together with him included the Minister in the Prime Minister's Department, Tan Sri Dr. Koh Tsu Koon, Minister of Housing and Local Government, Dato' Chor Chee Heung and the Home Minister, Datuk Seri Panglima Hishammuddin Hussein. Other government officers were also present.

Grand Dinner 
Grand Dinner (世纪宴) was the final event of the 3-day celebration. The dinner was held on the final day of the celebration at the Dewan Wawasan, Jitra. The dinner was attended by more than 2500 Keat Hwa alumnus from all over the world.

One of the peak event during the dinner was the performance which included more than 100 students from 6 Keat Hwa schools. The performance was to showcase the 100 years of Keat Hwa through drama and dance.

See also
 Keat Hwa Secondary School
 Keat Hwa II Secondary School
 Keat Hwa High School

References

Keat Hwa Education Group
Chinese-language schools in Malaysia
Historical events in Malaysia